William Webster (28 June 1876 – 11 April 1948) was a Scottish first-class cricketer and stockbroker.

Webster was born at Aberdeen in June 1876. A club cricketer for Aberdeenshire Cricket Club, Webster made his debut for Scotland in first-class cricket against the touring South Africans at Edinburgh in 1907. He played first-class for Scotland until 1912, making five appearances. Playing in the Scottish side as an all-rounder, he scored 102 runs at an average of 12.75; he made one half century, a score of 65 against Ireland in 1909. With his right-arm fast-medium bowling, he took 8 wickets at a bowling average of 26.12, with best figures of 3 for 30. By profession, Webster was a stockbroker. He died in April 1948 at New Aberdour, Aberdeenshire.

References

External links

1876 births
1948 deaths
Cricketers from Aberdeen
Scottish stockbrokers
Scottish cricketers